Silver Strand, or simply The Strand, is a low, narrow, sandy isthmus or tombolo  long in San Diego County, California partially within the Silver Strand State Beach. It connects Coronado Island with Imperial Beach. Together with the Point Loma peninsula it shelters and defines San Diego Bay. State Route 75 (SR 75) runs the length of the strand and is a popular site for jogging and bicycling. The Silver Strand Half Marathon is run along the route each November.

Silver Strand State Beach, which encompasses both the San Diego Bay and Pacific Ocean sides of the strand, is a little farther off the beaten path of the highly popular beaches in Ocean Beach and Mission Beach, offering more solitude for those who wish to avoid beach crowds. The ocean side of the strand features  of coastline trimmed with silver shells (thus named Silver Strand).

Beach

The beach offers many activities including camping, surfing, swimming, body boarding, jet skiing, sailing, water skiing, beach volleyball and fishing. There are approximately 130 first come, first served campsites. Park facilities include four large parking lots, which can accommodate up to 1,000 vehicles. Popular activities at this recreational destination include camping, fishing, swimming, surfing, boating, water-skiing, volleyball, and picnicking. Anglers can fish for perch, corbina, grunion and yellow-fin croaker.

Navy bases
The beaches north and south of the state beach are Department of Defense property. North of it is Naval Amphibious Base Coronado and south of it is Silver Strand Training Complex. Much of the SEALs' training takes place on the beaches.

See also
 List of beaches in San Diego County
 List of California state parks
 SS Monte Carlo

References

External links
 

Peninsulas of California
Landforms of San Diego County, California
San Diego Bay
Parks in San Diego County, California
Coronado, California